Mr. Barnes of New York is a 1922 American silent drama film directed by Victor Schertzinger and starring Tom Moore, Anna Lehr and Naomi Childers. It is an adaptation of the novel of the same name by Archibald Clavering Gunter, which had previously been turned into a 1914 film.

Plot
As described in a film magazine, American traveler Mr. Barnes (Moore) becomes involved in a Corsican feud when he unexpectedly witnesses a duel between a native and an English naval officer. The slain man's sister Marina Paoli (Lehr) vows vengeance. She hires an artist to paint a picture of the duel and has it hung in an art gallery in Paris, where detectives watch in an effort to discover the identity of the English officer. Barnes sees the painting and overhears a beautiful young English woman tell a friend that she has fallen in love with one of the men in the painting. The picture is his own, and he follows her as she goes to catch a train. Through the connivance of a porter on the train, he steers the young woman, Enid Anstruther (Childers) into a friendly relationship with himself. By the time they reach Nice, Barnes is head over heels in love with Enid and suspects that it is her brother Gerard (Willoughby) who is the naval officer implicated in the duel. Gerard is deeply in love with Marina, who refuses to marry him because of her vow. Her guardian Count Danella (Ainsworth) wants to marry her and conspires to have her marry Gerard and to then tell her that he is the man who killed her brother. The Count believes that this will force her to avenge her brother's killing, leaving Marina to marry him. Through the investigation of Barnes it turns out that Gerard had loaned his pistols to another officer and it was that man who shot Marina's brother. This leaves the way clear for Gerard and Marina and for Barnes and Enid to get married.

Cast
 Tom Moore as Mr. Barnes  
 Anna Lehr as Marina Paoli  
 Naomi Childers as Enid Anstruther  
 Louis Willoughby as Gerard Anstruther 
 Ramon Novarro as Antonio  
 Otto Hoffman as Tomasso  
 Sidney Ainsworth as Count Danella

Preservation
A print of Mr. Barnes of New York exists at the George Eastman House.

References

Bibliography
 Allan R. Ellenberger. Ramon Novarro: A Biography of the Silent Film Idol, 1899-1968. McFarland, 1999.

External links

1922 films
1922 drama films
1920s English-language films
American silent feature films
Silent American drama films
Films based on American novels
Films directed by Victor Schertzinger
American black-and-white films
Films with screenplays by Gerald Duffy
1920s American films